Eumorpha (meaning "well formed") is a genus of moths in the family Sphingidae. The genus is mostly found in North and South America.

Species
Eumorpha achemon (Drury, 1773)
Eumorpha adamsi (Rothschild & Jordan, 1903)
Eumorpha analis (Rothschild & Jordan, 1903)
Eumorpha anchemolus (Cramer, 1779)
Eumorpha capronnieri (Boisduval, 1875)
Eumorpha cissi (Schaufuss, 1870)
Eumorpha drucei (Rothschild & Jordan, 1903)
Eumorpha elisa (Smyth, 1901)
Eumorpha fasciatus (Sulzer, 1776)
Eumorpha intermedia (Clark, 1917)
Eumorpha labruscae (Linnaeus, 1758)
Eumorpha megaeacus (Hübner, 1816)
Eumorpha mirificatus (Grote, 1874)
Eumorpha neuburgeri (Rothschild & Jordan, 1903)
Eumorpha obliquus (Rothschild & Jordan, 1903)
Eumorpha pandorus (Hübner, 1821)
Eumorpha phorbas (Cramer, 1775)
Eumorpha satellitia (Linnaeus, 1771)
Eumorpha strenua (Menetries, 1857)
Eumorpha translineatus (Rothschild, 1895)
Eumorpha triangulum (Rothschild & Jordan, 1903)
Eumorpha typhon (Klug, 1836)
Eumorpha vitis (Linnaeus, 1758)

Species gallery

References

External links

 
Moth genera
Moths of North America
Moths of South America
Moths of Central America
Moths of the Caribbean
Philampelini
Taxa named by Jacob Hübner